The Cedar River is a  river in the U.S. state of Michigan, flowing through Clare County and Gladwin County.

Another tributary, Cranberry Creek rises in Arnold and Cranberry lakes a few miles northeast of Harrison.

Tributaries and features 
From the mouth:
 (left) Doone Creek
 (left) Farm Drain
 (right) Canham Drain
 (left) Lucas Drain
 (left) Swan Lake (also known as Slaughterhouse Lake)
 City of Gladwin
 Bendle Drain
 Silver Creek
 Chappel Dam
 Wiggins Lake (also known as Chappel Pond)
 (left) Howland Creek
 Howland Lake
 (left) Frost Lake
 (left) Smith Creek
 (right) Lake Contos
 (left) Puro Lake
 Mud Lake
 Pratt Lake
 (right) North Branch Cedar River
 (left) Peach Lake
 (left) McGilvery Lake
 (left) Schoolhouse Lake
 (right) Greasy Jim Lake
 (left) Blue Lake
 Island Lake
 (left) Streaked Lake
 Trout Lake (Gladwin County)
 House Lake
 Hoister Lake (also known as Holster Lake)
 (right) Middle Branch Cedar River
 (right) Lindy Lake
 (left) Lake Little George
 Trout Lake (Clare County)
 (left) Decker Lake
 (right) West Branch Cedar River
 (left) Popple Creek
 (left) Cranberry Creek
 Cranberry Lake
 Arnold Lake

Drainage basin 
The Cedar River drains portions of the following:
 Clare County
 Arthur Township
 Franklin Township
 Frost Township
 Hamilton Township
 Hayes Township
 Gladwin County, Michigan
 City of Beaverton
 Beaverton Township
 Buckeye Township
 City of Gladwin
 Gladwin Township
 Grout Township
 Sage Township
 Sherman Township
 Tobacco Township

References 

Rivers of Michigan
Rivers of Gladwin County, Michigan
Rivers of Clare County, Michigan
Tributaries of Lake Huron